United States gubernatorial elections were held in three states and one territory, on November 1, 1975, in Louisiana, and three days later in Kentucky and Mississippi. No governorships changed hands in these elections, as all three southern states remained under Democratic control.

This was the first gubernatorial election in Louisiana's history which was conducted under the nonpartisan blanket primary (a.k.a. "jungle primary") format.

Election results
A bolded state name features an article about the specific election.

Notes

References